General elections are due to be held in the Marshall Islands in November 2023.

Electoral system 
The 33 members of the Nitijeļā were elected in 19 single-member constituencies via first-past-the-post voting and five multi-member constituencies of between two and five seats via plurality block voting.

References 

 
Marshall
General election
Elections in the Marshall Islands